Zamkova Hora hill (literally Castle Hill) in Kyiv, Ukraine is a historical landmark in the center of the city. It is part of the city's geographic relief complex known as Kyiv Mountains (or Kyiv Hills). The place is called "Zamkova" because Vytautas the Great had his castle here. Other names: Khorevytsya, Kyselivka, Frolovska, Lysa Hora. Some important events of Ukrainian history took place on the hill.

According to some researchers, Zamkova Hora also has a mystical prehistory, supposedly being one of the lysi hory ("bald mountains") - the sites of the witch gatherings. Geographically, it is really "bald" (lacking trees) from several sides.

In the 18th century a cemetery was established on the hill (now abandoned).

It is now a small landscape park in Podil Raion still containing interesting grave monuments. Zamkova Hora is also one of two hills that border the Andriyivskyy Descent.

Reclaiming the mystical essence of the hill, local satanist groups have conducted their ceremonies there since late 1980s. Small ritual structures were covertly built on site.

See also
Lysa Hora (Kyiv)
Florovsky Convent

External links
 Zamkovagora Project (named after the hill, aimed to study and preserve not only it, but also other landmarks of old Kyiv)

Former castles in Ukraine
History of Kyiv
Tourist attractions in Kyiv
Hills of Kyiv
European witchcraft
Former buildings and structures in Ukraine
Andriyivskyy Descent
Podilskyi District